The 2010 Team Long Track World Championship was the fourth annual FIM Team Long Track World Championship. The final took place on 4 September 2010 in Morizès, France. The Championship was won by the defending champion Germany who beat host team France and The Netherlands. It was fourth champion title for German riders.

Results
  Morizès "Piste du Parc Municipal" (Length: 520 m)
 4 September 2010 (21:00 UTC+1)
 Referee:  Istvan Darago
 Jury President:  Anthony Noel
 References:

Heat details

See also
 2010 Individual Long Track World Championship
 2010 Speedway World Cup

References

Team Long Track World Championship
Team Long Track World Championship, 2010
Longtrack